The West Carroll Parish School Board is an entity responsible for the operation of public schools in West Carroll Parish, Louisiana, United States. It is headquartered in the  parish seat of Oak Grove.

In the 2012–2013 school year, West Carroll Parish public schools had the tenth highest rate of improvement statewide in the annual end-of-course examinations administered in Algebra I and English II.

Schools
Grades 7-12
Oak Grove High School (Oak Grove)
Oak Grove Elementary School (Oak Grove)
Grades PK-12
Epps High School (Epps)
Forest High School (Forest)
Kilbourne High School (Kilbourne)

Demographics
Total Students (as of October 1, 2007): 2,308
Gender
Male: 53%
Female: 47%
Race/Ethnicity
White: 78.51%
African American: 18.85%
Hispanic: 2.38%
Asian: 0.13%
Native American: 0.13%
Socio-Economic Indicators
At-Risk: 71.88%
Free Lunch: 62.39%
Reduced Lunch: 9.49%

See also
List of school districts in Louisiana

References

External links
Forest Bulldogs site
West Carroll Parish School Board site

School districts in Louisiana
Education in West Carroll Parish, Louisiana